Joi Baba Felunath may refer to:
 Joi Baba Felunath (novel), a 1975 novel by Satyajit Ray
 Joi Baba Felunath (film), a 1979 film directed by Satyajit Ray, based on the novel